This is a list of the Australian species of the family Depressariidae. It also acts as an index to the species articles and forms part of the full List of moths of Australia.

Barantola panarista (Turner, 1917)
Barantola pulcherrima Walker, 1864
Bleptochiton leucotrigona Turner, 1947
Doleromima hypoxantha (Lower, 1897)
Eclecta aurorella Meyrick, 1883
Ectaga garcia Becker, 1994
Enchocrates glaucopis Meyrick, 1883
Enchocrates habroschema (Turner, 1946)
Enchocrates phaedryntis Meyrick, 1887
Enchocrates picrophylla Meyrick, 1886
Enchocrates vasperascens Meyrick, 1921
Enteremna dolerastis (Meyrick, 1890)
Enteremna pallida (Turner, 1939)
Euprionocera geminipuncta Turner, 1896
Eutorna diaula Meyrick, 1906
Eutorna epicnephes Meyrick, 1906
Eutorna eurygramma Meyrick, 1906
Eutorna generalis Meyrick, 1921
Eutorna intonsa Meyrick, 1906
Eutorna leptographa Meyrick, 1906
Eutorna pabulicola Meyrick, 1906
Eutorna phaulocosma Meyrick, 1906
Eutorna plumbeola Turner, 1947
Eutorna rubida (Turner, 1919)
Eutorna spintherias Meyrick, 1906
Eutorna tricasis Meyrick, 1906
Gymnoceros nipholeuca (Turner, 1946)
Gymnoceros pallidula Turner, 1946
Haereta cryphimaea Turner, 1947
Haereta niphosceles Turner, 1947
Heterobathra xiphosema Lower, 1901
Lepidozancla zatrephes Turner, 1916
Loboptila cyphoma (Meyrick, 1915)
Loboptila leurodes Turner, 1919
Mimozela rhoditis Meyrick, 1914
Notosara acosmeta (Common, 1964)
Notosara nephelotis Meyrick, 1890
Octasphales chorderes Meyrick, 1902
Octasphales eubrocha Turner, 1917
Pedois amaurophanes (Turner, 1947)
Pedois anthracias Lower, 1902
Pedois argillea (Turner, 1927)
Pedois ceramora (Meyrick, 1902)
Pedois cosmopoda (Turner, 1900)
Pedois epinephela (Turner, 1947)
Pedois haploceros (Turner, 1946)
Pedois humerana (Walker, 1863)
Pedois lewinella (Newman, 1856)
Pedois lutea (Turner, 1927)
Pedois rhaphidias (Turner, 1917)
Pedois rhodomita (Turner, 1900)
Pedois sarcinodes (Meyrick, 1921)
Pedois tripunctella (Walker, 1864)
Peritornenta bacchata (Meyrick, 1914)
Peritornenta circulatella (Walker, 1864)
Peritornenta lissopis (Turner, 1947)
Peritornenta minans (Meyrick, 1921)
Peritornenta rhodophanes (Meyrick, 1902)
Peritornenta stigmatias Turner, 1900
Peritornenta thyellia (Meyrick, 1902)
Psorosticha zizyphi (Stainton, 1859)
Scorpiopsis pyrobola (Meyrick, 1887)
Scorpiopsis rhodoglauca Meyrick, 1930
Thalamarchella alveola (R. Felder & Rogenhofer, 1875)
Thalamarchella aneureta Common, 1964
Thalamarchella robinsoni Common, 1964
Thyromorpha stibaropis Turner, 1917
Tonica effractella (Snellen, 1878)

External links
Depressariidae at Australian Faunal Directory

Australia